Anton Julius Carlson (January 29, 1875 – September 2, 1956) was a Swedish American physiologist.  Carlson was chairman of the Physiology Department at the University of Chicago from 1916 until 1940.

Biography
Carlson was born the son of Carl Jacobson and Hedvig Andersdotter in Svarteborg, in Västra Götaland County, Sweden. He came to the United States in 1891. He graduated from  Augustana College in Rock Island, Illinois, (BA, 1898)(MS, 1899). He received a doctorate in physiology at Stanford in 1902 and began working at the University of Chicago in 1904.  While Carlson was at Chicago, he conducted experiments on Fred Vlcek, similar to those conducted on Alexis St. Martin by William Beaumont, regarding his gastric fistula.  These included illuminating his stomach with electric lights in order to observe digestion.  Carlson became chairman of the physiology department at the University of Chicago in 1916 and remained chairman until 1940.

Carlson was president of the American Physiological Society from 1923 to 1925, and president of the AAAS in 1944. Carlson was elected a foreign member of the Royal Swedish Academy of Sciences in 1929.

The cover story of the February 10, 1941, issue of Time magazine was devoted to Carlson's success as a teacher and his comparative studies of the muscular action of the heart in humans and the horseshoe crab. Carlson was one of 34 original signers of the Humanist Manifesto and in 1953 he was the first person to receive the American Humanist Association's Humanist of the Year award.

Selected works

The Control of Hunger In Health And Disease (University of Chicago Press. 1916)
Organotherapeutics (D. Appleton and Company. 1924)
The Machinery of the Body (University of Chicago Press, 1930). With Victor E. Johnson (1901-1986)

References 
Specific citations

General references
Dragstedt, Lester R Anton Julius Carlson, January 29, 1875 - September 2, 1956 (Biographical memoirs. National Academy of Sciences. 1961)

External links 
 Carlson in The University of Chicago Faculty: A Centennial View
 Carlson page at the AAAS web site
 National Academy of Sciences Biographical Memoir
 

1875 births
1956 deaths
Augustana College (Illinois) alumni
People from Munkedal Municipality
Stanford University alumni
Swedish physiologists
American physiologists
Members of the Royal Swedish Academy of Sciences
Swedish emigrants to the United States
University of Chicago staff